Mad Duck Theatre Collective is a Vancouver, British Columbia based theatre company that has been presenting classical theatre for the modern stage.

Mad Duck in committed to exploring new and non traditional stagings, presenting women in non traditional roles and colorblind casting.

Past Productions 
Member Projects between 2006 and 2009 have included William Shakespeare's Coriolanus and Shakespeare's R&J, based on the play by William Shakespeare. In 2001 and 2002, Non Equity Co-ops mounted productions of Not About Nightingales by Tennessee Williams and 7 Actors and a Dog do A Midsummer Night's Dream. Between 2003 and 2006, Equity Co-ops staged three Shakespeare plays: Titus Andronicus, Julius Caesar and The Tempest.

Awards and nominations

Shakespeare's R&J
Vancouver Courier Top Theatre Productions of 2006
Vancouverplays.com - Play of the Month

Jessie Richardson Award Nominations:
Outstanding Performance by a Supporting Actor - Josh Drebit
Outstanding Direction - Jack Paterson

Titus Andronicus

Vancouverplays.com - March Play of the Month Award
The Ray Michal Award for Outstanding Body of Work by an Emerging Director 2006 - Jack Paterson

Jessie Richardson Theatre Awards Nominations:
Outstanding Performance by an Actor in a Supporting Role - Jason Emanuel (Aaron)
Outstanding Performance by an Actor in a Supporting Role - Mike Wasko (Lucius)
Outstanding Performance by an Actress in a Supporting Role - Lesley Ewen (Markus)
Outstanding Costume Design - Moira Fentum
Outstanding Direction - Jack Paterson

Julius Caesar

Jessie Richardson Theatre Awards Nominations:
Outstanding Performance by a Lead Actor - Craig Erickson (Antony)
Outstanding Direction - Jack Paterson

The Tempest

Jessie Richardson Theatre Awards Nominations:
Outstanding Performance by a Lead Actress - Gwynyth Walsh (Prospero)

Women in Shakespeare 
Non-traditional roles played by women in Mad Duck productions

Titus Andronius:
Marcus Andronicus - Lesley Ewen
Chiron - Laura Jaszcz
Ǣmilius - Christina Schild

Julius Caesar:
Soothsayer, Decius Brutus, Pindarus - Christina Schild
Lucius, Cinna the Poet, Titinius - Samantha Jo Simmonds/ Kate Braidsworth
Strato - Teryl Rothery
Octavius - Robin Mooney

The Tempest:
Prospero - Gwynyth Walsh
Ariel (Shakespeare) - Jennifer Paterson
Antonio - Carole Higgins
Gonzallo - Pam Hyatt

A Midsummer Night's Dream:
Quince - Anna Cummer
Snout - Sarah Hattingh

References

External links 
Duck Theatre Collective Website

Theatre companies in British Columbia
Theatre in Vancouver
Shakespearean theatre companies